Milichiella is a genus of freeloader flies in the family Milichiidae.

Species

Aethiops
 Milichiella aethiops (Malloch, 1913)
 Milichiella mexicana Brake, 2009
 Milichiella opuntiae Brake, 2009
 Milichiella pachycerei Brake, 2009
 Milichiella peyotei Brake, 2009
 Milichiella pseudopuntiae Brake, 2009
 Milichiella santacatalinae Brake, 2009

Argentea
 Milichiella aldabrae Brake, 2009
 Milichiella argentea (Fabricius, 1805)
 Milichiella angolae Brake, 2009
 Milichiella argentiventris Hendel, 1931
 Milichiella argyrogaster (1876)
 Milichiella asiatica Brake, 2009
 Milichiella bakeri Aldrich, 1931
 Milichiella bimaculata Becker, 1907
 Milichiella christmas Brake, 2009
 Milichiella circularis Aldrich, 1931
 Milichiella formosae Brake, 2009
 Milichiella javana de Meijere, 1911
 Milichiella lacteiventris Malloch, 1931
 Milichiella longiseta Hardy & Delfinado, 1980
 Milichiella melaleuca (Loew, 1863)
 Milichiella nigella Iwasa, 2011
 Milichiella nigeriae Duda, 1935
 Milichiella nigripes Malloch, 1931
 Milichiella pseudodectes (Séguy, 1933)
 Milichiella quintargentea  Brake, 2009
 Milichiella solitaria (Lamb, 1914)
 Milichiella spinthera Hendel, 1913
 Milichiella sterkstrooma Brake, 2009
 Milichiella sulawesiensis Iwasa, 2011
 Milichiella sumptuosa de Meijere, 1911
 Milichiella tiefii (Mik, 1887)
 Milichiella tosi Becker, 1907
 Milichiella triangula Brake, 2009
 Milichiella ugandae Brake, 2009
 Milichiella unicolor (de Meijere, 1906)

Chilensis
 Milichiella breviarista Brake, 2009
 Milichiella chilensis Brake, 2009
 Milichiella conventa Brake, 2009

Cinerea
 Milichiella cavernae Brake, 2009
 Milichiella cinerea (Coquillett, 1900)
 Milichiella urbana Malloch, 1913

Dimidata
 Milichiella cingulata Becker, 1907
 Milichiella dimidiata (Wiedemann, 1830)

Faviformis
 Milichiella brevirostris Brake, 2009
 Milichiella faviformis Brake, 2009
 Milichiella longirostris Brake, 2009
 Milichiella mojingae Brake, 2009
 Milichiella variata Brake, 2009
 Milichiella virginae Brake, 2009
 Milichiella zaiziksensis Brake, 2009

Frontalis
 Milichiella concavum (Becker, 1907)
 Milichiella frontalis (Becker, 1907)
 Milichiella montanum (Becker, 1907)

Lacteipennis
 Milichiella arcuata (Loew, 1876)
 Milichiella argenteocincta Johnson, 1919
 Milichiella bisignata Melander, 1913
 Milichiella lacteipennis (Loew, 1876)
 Milichiella lucidula Becker, 1907
 Milichiella rugosistyla  Brake, 2009
 Milichiella striata Brake, 2009
 Milichiella villarricae Brake, 2009

Mollis
 Milichiella badia Brake, 2009
 Milichiella booloombae Brake, 2009
 Milichiella cooloolae Brake, 2009
 Milichiella mollis Brake, 2009
 Milichiella multisetae Brake, 2009

Nudiventris
 Milichiella nudiventris Becker, 1907
 Milichiella turrialbae Brake, 2009

Poecilogastra
 Milichiella boliviana Brake, 2009
 Milichiella maculatiradii Brake, 2009
 Milichiella metallica Brake, 2009
 Milichiella poecilogastra  (Becker, 1907)

Ungrouped
 Milichiella abditoargentea Brake, 2009
 Milichiella aberrata Becker, 1907
 Milichiella acantha Brake, 2009
 Milichiella aeroplana Brake, 2009
 Milichiella anterogrisea Brake, 2009
 Milichiella argenteidorsa Brake, 2009
 Milichiella argentinae Brake, 2009
 Milichiella bella Brake, 2009
 Milichiella bermaguiensis Brake, 2009
 Milichiella bruneiensis Brake, 2009
 Milichiella chocolata Brake, 2009
 Milichiella cochiseae  Brake, 2009
 Milichiella dominicae Brake, 2009
 Milichiella flavilunulae Brake, 2009
 Milichiella flaviventris Brake, 2009
 Milichiella fusciventris  Brake, 2009
 Milichiella griseomacula Brake, 2009
 Milichiella hendeli Brake, 2000
 Milichiella iberica Carles-Tolrá, 2001
 Milichiella inbio Brake, 2009
 Milichiella jamaicensi Brake, 2009
 Milichiella laselvae  Brake, 2009
 Milichiella lasuizae Brake, 2009
 Milichiella madagascarensis Brake, 2009
 Milichiella mathisi Brake, 2009
 Milichiella novateutoniae Brake, 2009
 Milichiella parva (Macquart, 1843)
 Milichiella plaumanni Brake, 2009
 Milichiella proclinata Brake, 2009
 Milichiella punctata Brake, 2009
 Milichiella rufa Brake, 2009
 Milichiella rutila Brake, 2009
 Milichiella sculpta Brake, 2009
 Milichiella tricincta Becker, 1907
 Milichiella trisetae Brake, 2009
 Milichiella tristis Becker, 1907
 Milichiella velutina Becker, 1907
 Milichiella vidua Becker, 1907
 Milichiella weejasperensis'' Brake, 2009

References

Further reading

External links

 

Milichiidae
Carnoidea genera